The Roman Catholic Diocese of Vitebsk is a diocese located in the city of Vitebsk in the Ecclesiastical province of Minsk-Mohilev in Belarus.

History
 13 October 1999: Established as Diocese of Vitebsk  from the Metropolitan Archdiocese of Minsk – Mohilev

Leadership
 Bishops of Vitebsk (Roman rite)
 Wladyslaw Blin (Уладзіслаў БЛІН) (since 13 Oct 1999)
 Aleh Butkevich (Алег Буткевіч)  (since 29 Nov 2013)

Churches 
 Church of the Divine Providence in Słobódka
 Church of the Corpus Christi in

See also
Roman Catholicism in Belarus

References

Sources
 Official website
 GCatholic.org
 Catholic Hierarchy

Roman Catholic dioceses in Belarus
Christian organizations established in 1999
Roman Catholic dioceses and prelatures established in the 20th century
1999 establishments in Belarus